Davie County Courthouse  is a historic courthouse located at Mocksville, Davie County, North Carolina. It was built in 1909, and is a two-story reinforced concrete and tan brick structure in the Classical Revival style. It features a tetrastyle Corinthian order in antis portico which shelters the center front entrance, with an ornate square clock cupola.  The building was restored and renovated following a fire in 1916. The interior was renovated in 1971.

It was added to the National Register of Historic Places in 1979. It is located in the Downtown Mocksville Historic District.

References

County courthouses in North Carolina
Courthouses on the National Register of Historic Places in North Carolina
Neoclassical architecture in North Carolina
Government buildings completed in 1909
Buildings and structures in Davie County, North Carolina
National Register of Historic Places in Davie County, North Carolina
Historic district contributing properties in North Carolina